Robbery laws in the United States

Federal

Federal
U.S. Code Title 18- Not more than 15 years' imprisonment.

Uniform Code of Military Justice 
For individuals subject to the Uniform Code of Military Justice, 10 U.S. Code § 922 applies.

State

Alabama

Alaska

Arizona 

A fine is $750-150,000. A fine for each offense of those charges are no different.

Arkansas

California

Colorado

Connecticut

Delaware

District of Columbia 
Not less than 2 years and not more than 15 years' imprisonment. If the defendant was armed, 30 years. Depending on the nature of the prior offense and the person’s criminal history, it could also include a mandatory minimum sentence of 5 or 10 years.

Florida

Georgia

Hawaii

Idaho 
Not less than 5 years and not more than life imprisonment (eligible for parole after serving 25 years)

Illinois

Indiana
1-6 years in prison (3-16 years if the defendant was armed)

Iowa

Kansas

Kentucky 
Not less than 5 years and not more than 10 years' imprisonment (if imprisonment is imposed and no felonies within prior 5 years)

Louisiana 
Not more than 7 years' imprisonment with or without hard labor (not less than 2 years and not more than 20 years' imprisonment with or without hard labor if object of robbery was a purse containing anything of value)

Maine 
Not more than 10 years' imprisonment

Maryland 
Not more than 15 years' imprisonment

Massachusetts 
Not more than life imprisonment (eligible for parole after serving not less than 15 years and not more than 25 years) or any term of years

Michigan 
Not more than 15 years' imprisonment

Minnesota 
Not more than 10 years' imprisonment

Mississippi 
Not more than 15 years' imprisonment

Missouri 
Not less than 5 years and not more than 15 years' imprisonment (if imprisonment is imposed)

Montana 
Not less than 2 years and not more than 40 years' imprisonment

Nebraska 
Not less than 1 year and not more than 50 years' imprisonment (if imprisonment is imposed)

Nevada 
Not less than 2 years and not more than 15 years' imprisonment (if imprisonment is imposed)

New Hampshire 
Not more than 7 years' imprisonment

New Jersey 
Not less than 5 years and not more than 10 years' imprisonment (if imprisonment is imposed)

New Mexico 
Not more than 3 years' imprisonment

New York

North Carolina
Not less than 8 months and not more than 16 months' imprisonment (if imprisonment is imposed and little to no criminal history)

North Dakota 
Not more than 5 years' imprisonment

Ohio 
9, 12, 18, 24, 30, or 36 months' imprisonment (if imprisonment is imposed)

Oklahoma 
Not more than 10 years' imprisonment

Oregon 
Not more than 5 years' imprisonment

Pennsylvania 
Not more than 10 years' imprisonment

Rhode Island 
Not less than 5 years and not more than 30 years' imprisonment (if imprisonment is imposed)

South Carolina 
Not more than 15 years' imprisonment

South Dakota

Tennessee 
Not less than 2.7 years and not more than 15 years' imprisonment (if imprisonment is imposed)

Texas 
Not less than 2 years and not more than 20 years' imprisonment (if imprisonment is imposed)

Utah 
Not less than 1 year and not more than 15 years' imprisonment (if imprisonment is imposed)

Vermont 
Not more than 10 years' imprisonment

Virginia 
Not less than 5 years and not more than life imprisonment (eligible for parole after serving 15 years)

Washington 
Not more than 10 years' imprisonment

West Virginia 
Not less than 5 years and not more than 18 years' imprisonment

Wisconsin 
Not more than 10 years' imprisonment

Wyoming 
Not more than 10 years' imprisonment

References 

Robbery